Johnnie Mae Chappell ( – March 23, 1964) was an American murder victim during race riots in Jacksonville, Florida, killed by a gunshot from a passing car. After evidence and documents went missing her killer was charged with manslaughter - only serving three years in prison - and the other passengers were never charged. Detectives working the investigation claimed they lost their jobs due to their complaints regarding police racism and how the case was handled.

Life
Johnnie Mae Chappell was a mother of 10 and worked as a cleaner. Her husband was named Willie, and worked two jobs.

Death
During race riots in Jacksonville, Florida on the evening of March 23, 1964, Chappell (then 35) was walking along U.S. Route 1 northwest of the city looking for her wallet, which had fallen from her bag while carrying groceries home. As she walked, four men drove past in a blue Plymouth, one of whom fired a gunshot which hit Chappell. After being found by her husband who had left the house to look for her, Chappell was being transported to a hospital in an ambulance when she died.

As word of Chappell's killing spread, riots escalated in the city.

Investigations
The case of Chappell's death went unsolved for months until two sheriff detectives, Lee Cody  and Donald Coleman Sr., interrogated a young local called Wayne Chessman about the murder. Chessman confessed to being in the car with three other men, giving their names and details of the evening. Chessman stated that a man named J.W. Rich was the one to fire the gun; he and the other passengers were subsequently arrested by Cody and Coleman who say they then confessed to shooting Chappell. When they went to read the paperwork regarding Chappell's death, however, they found that it was missing, later finding it under the mat in their boss's office.

The four men went to trial, but the gun used in the shooting went missing and the detectives were not asked to testify about the confessions. As a result, the jury charged Rich with manslaughter and the charges were dropped against the other men. Rich served three years in prison, and Cody and Coleman were demoted and later fired after complaining about racism and corruption in the department.

On the 32nd anniversary of Chappell's murder one of her sons, Shelton, organized a memorial church service for their family. Having seen an article about the planned service in the local newspaper, Cody attended, and told the family the details of Chappell's murder and his investigation. In 2005 Cody and Shelton filed a civil rights lawsuit against the city of Jacksonville and the men in the car; the suit was dismissed but Jeb Bush asked the Florida Department of Law Enforcement to re-open the murder investigation.

References

Further reading

External links
Wanted Justice: Johnnie Mae Chappell on IMDb

1964 deaths
American murder victims
1964 murders in the United States
Year of birth uncertain
March 1964 events in the United States
 People murdered in Florida
Deaths by firearm in Florida